was a Japanese politician of the Liberal Democratic Party, a member of the House of Councillors in the Diet (national legislature). A graduate of Waseda University, he was elected to the House of Councillors for the first time in 2001 after serving in the assembly of Nagano Prefecture for five terms since 1983.

Further reading

References

External links 
 Official website in Japanese.

1949 births
2019 deaths
Liberal Democratic Party (Japan) politicians
Members of the House of Councillors (Japan)
Waseda University alumni